The Estádio 22 de Junho (22 June stadium) is an Angolan stadium built and owned by G.D. Interclube and is the venue for the club's home games in all events that it takes part of. The 8,000-seat stadium was inaugurated on February 2, 2005  and is located in the Rocha Pinto neighborhood, Maianga district, Luanda, Angola. The stadium is one of the few private-owned stadiums in Luanda as the remaining teams based in the capital play in state-owned 11 de Novembro, Cidadela and Coqueiros.

References

Sports venues in Angola
Buildings and structures in Luanda
G.D. Interclube